Since 1969 Rubicon has been a titular see of the Roman Catholic Church. It takes its name from the lapsed Diocese of Rubicón in Spain, previously a suffragan in the ecclesiastical province of the Archdiocese of Seville.

External links
 Rubicon on catholic-hierarchy.org
 Entry on gcatholic.org 
  Apostolische Nachfolge – Titularsitze 

Catholic titular sees in Europe